Rokeya Afzal Rahman is a Bangladeshi businesswoman and former adviser of Caretaker government of Bangladesh.

Career
Rahman is the chairman of the board of directors of the Asian University for Women Support Foundation in Bangladesh. she is the President of the Women Entrepreneurs Association. She is also the president of Bangladesh Federation of Women Entrepreneurs. She is the chairperson of MIDAS Financing Limited.

References

Living people
Advisors of Caretaker Government of Bangladesh
Bangladeshi businesspeople
Year of birth missing (living people)
Bangladeshi bankers